Gizo/Kolombangara is a single-member constituency of the National Parliament of Solomon Islands. Located in Western Province and covering Gizo and Kolombangara, it was established in 1976 when the Legislative Assembly was expanded from 24 to 38 seats, with the Gizo/Ranongga/Simbo/Kolombangara constituency split into Gizo/Kolombangara and Ranongga/Simbo. Former Gizo/Ranongga/Simbo/Kolombangara MP George Ngumi contested the seat in the 1976 elections, but was defeated by Lawry Eddie Wickham.

List of MPs

Election results

2019

2014

2010

2006

2001

1997

1993

1989

1985

1984

1980

1976

References

Solomon Islands parliamentary constituencies
Legislative Assembly of the Solomon Islands constituencies
Gizo, Solomon Islands
Western Province (Solomon Islands)
1976 establishments in the Solomon Islands
Constituencies established in 1976